Roald Edgar Aas (25 March 1928 – 18 February 2012) was a speed skater and cyclist from Norway. He was born in Oslo. Aas was the number two speed skater in Norway through the entire 1950s—initially after Hjalmar Andersen, later after Knut Johannesen. He became Norwegian champion once, in 1956, but finished second seven times.

Aas participated in all international championships between 1951 and 1960, almost always finishing in the top ten. He won bronze at the World Allround Speed Skating Championships in 1958, and at two European Speed Skating Championships, in 1957 and 1960. At the Oslo Winter Olympics, he won bronze on the 1500 m, while at the Squaw Valley Winter Olympics in 1960, he finally won gold, shared with Yevgeny Grishin, also in 1500 m.

Aas also was a successful cyclist, winning the 1956 Norwegian Championships in both road cycling and track cycling. For his achievements as both a speed skater and a cyclist, Aas was awarded the prestigious Egebergs Ærespris in 1956.

Until 1956, Aas represented Oslo Idrettslag (Oslo Sports Club) – from 1957 on, he represented Oslo Skøiteklub (Oslo Skating Club). When he ended his skating career, he became a coach at Oslo Skøiteklub.

After his retirement, he worked as a stock manager for Jordan Dental.

Medals 
An overview of medals won by Aas at important championships he participated in, listing the years in which he won each:

Personal records 
To put these personal records in perspective, the WR column lists the official world records on the dates that Aas skated his personal records.

Aas has an Adelskalender score of 185.337 points. His highest ranking on the Adelskalender was a thirteenth place.

References

External links 
 Roald Aas at SkateResults.com
 Roald Aas. Deutsche Eisschnelllauf Gemeinschaft e.V. (German Skating Association).
 Evert Stenlund's Adelskalender pages
 Historical World Records from the International Skating Union
 National Championships results from Norges Skøyteforbund (the Norwegian Skating Association)
 Roald Aas' obituary 

1928 births
2012 deaths
Norwegian male speed skaters
Olympic speed skaters of Norway
Speed skaters at the 1952 Winter Olympics
Speed skaters at the 1956 Winter Olympics
Speed skaters at the 1960 Winter Olympics
Olympic gold medalists for Norway
Olympic bronze medalists for Norway
Sportspeople from Oslo
Olympic medalists in speed skating
Medalists at the 1952 Winter Olympics
Medalists at the 1960 Winter Olympics
World Allround Speed Skating Championships medalists